Dave Jaumotte is a former American football player and coach. He served as the head football coach at Saint Francis University in Loretto, Pennsylvania from 1999 to 2001, compiling a record of 2–30. Prior to that, Jaumotte was an assistant coach in the Detroit Lions organization. He played college football at Purdue University.

Head coaching record

References

Year of birth missing (living people)
Living people
American football offensive tackles
Detroit Lions coaches
Purdue Boilermakers football players
Saint Francis Red Flash football coaches